Pavol Kosík (born 2 July 1980) is a Slovak former football striker.

References

External links 
 Spartak Myjava profile
 

1980 births
Living people
Association football forwards
Slovak footballers
Spartak Myjava players
MŠK Žilina players
FK Senica players
Slovak Super Liga players
People from Myjava
Sportspeople from the Trenčín Region